Michael Kawooya may refer to:

 Michael Kawooya (physician) (born 1958), Uganda professor of radiology and world expert in ultrasound
 Michael Kawooya (squash player) (born 1984), Ugandan squash player
 Micheal Kawooya (music artist) (born 2007), Ugandan-American singer-songwriter